Black & White Episode I: The Dawn of Assault (Mandarin: 痞子英雄首部曲：全面開戰) is a 2012 Taiwanese action thriller film directed by Tsai Yueh-hsun. It is a prequel to and based on the television series Black & White (2009).

The film stars Mark Chao as Wu Ying Xiong, reprising his role from the television series, with Huang Bo and Angelababy also starring.

Black & White Episode I: The Dawn of Assault was released on January 13, 2012.  A sequel, Black & White: The Dawn of Justice, was released in 2014.

Premise 
A brave policeman and a paranoid gangster are forced to team up for 36 hours to resolve a major crisis that could destroy their beloved Harbor City.

Cast
Mark Chao as Wu Ying Xiong
Huang Bo as Xu Da-Fu
Angelababy as Fan Ning
Terri Kwan as Tu Hsiao-ching
Leon Dai as Jabar
Alex To as SIS Captain Ou
Jack Kao as Yuan
Ken Lin as Tung
Dean Fujioka as Li Che-yong
Dino Acconci
Julio Acconci
Lin Yu-chih as Bao
Fox Hsu as Er Bao
Hsiu Chieh-kai
George Wu as Jack
Matt Wu
Hsia Ching-ting
Jason Tsou
Chien Te-men
Janine Chang as Lan Hsi-ying (voice)

Reception
The film earned NT$37.6 million at the Taipei box office and ¥89.5 million at the Chinese mainland box office.

On Film Business Asia, Derek Elley gave the film a grade of 3 out of 10 and said: "Taiwan's first action blockbuster is a fiasco, redeemed only by Mainland comic Huang Bo." Taipei Times complemented its action scenes, but criticized its characters and plot lines.

References

External links

2012 action thriller films
2012 films
Films based on television series
Taiwanese action thriller films